José Ilich Rodríguez (born December 18, 1974) is a former professional baseball pitcher. Rodríguez pitched 12 games in Major League Baseball, 6 in 2000 for the St. Louis Cardinals and 6 in 2002 for the Cardinals and Minnesota Twins.

Rodríguez last played professionally with the Newark Bears of the Atlantic League in 2007. Rodríguez signed a minor league contract with the Cleveland Indians in November 2008, but never played in their organization.

References

External links

1974 births
Living people
Albuquerque Isotopes players
Arkansas Travelers players
Bowie Baysox players
Brevard County Manatees players
Carolina Mudcats players
Edmonton Trappers players
FIU Panthers baseball players
Indian River State Pioneers baseball players
Johnson City Cardinals players
Major League Baseball pitchers
Major League Baseball players from Puerto Rico
Memphis Redbirds players
Minnesota Twins players
Newark Bears players
Ottawa Lynx players
People from Cayey, Puerto Rico
Peoria Chiefs players
Puerto Rican expatriate baseball players in Canada
Rochester Red Wings players
St. Louis Cardinals players
Macoto Cobras players
Puerto Rican expatriate baseball players in Taiwan
Cangrejeros de Santurce (baseball) players